This article is a list of Indian Saints, Blesseds, Venerables, and Servants of God recognized by the Roman Catholic Church. Majority of these men and women of religious life were born, died, or lived within India.

Apostles

Saints

Early times

Modern times

Group of martyrs
The Four Martyrs of Thane (d. 1321 in Thane, India), Roman Catholic
St. Thomas of Tolentino (Tommaso di Tolentino) (ca. 1255–1321), Professed Priest of the Franciscan Friars Minor (Italy)
Bl. James of Padua (Giacomo di Padua) (d. 1321), Professed Priest of the Franciscan Friars Minor (Italy)
Bl. Peter of Siena (Pietro di Siena) (d. 1321), Professed Religious of the Franciscan Friars Minor (Italy)
Demetrius of Tiflis (Demetrio da Tifliz) (d. 1321), Layperson of the Diocese of Quilon (Georgia-Armenia) 
Feast: 9 April

Beatified

Venerables

Servants of God
This section includes those who have been formally declared as a Servant of God by a bishop, or listed as a Servant of God by a conference of bishops.

Candidates for sainthood
This section includes those for whom a cause of sainthood or a diocesan investigation is in progress, but the person has not been declared as a Servant of God, although the term 'Servant of God' is sometimes used for such persons.

Others
This section includes persons who are regarded to have led holy and edifying lives, but for whom there is no cause or formal investigation in progress.

See also

 Catholic Church in India
 Christianity in India
 Beatification
 Venerable
 Servants of God
 Candidates for Sainthood
 List of Central American and Caribbean Saints
 List of Mexican Saints
 List of Saints from Africa
 List of Saints from Oceania
 List of Canadian Roman Catholic saints
 List of Saints from Asia
 List of American saints and beatified people
 Congregation for the Causes of Saints

References

External links
 "Hagiography Circle"
 

India

Venerated Catholics
Saints
Saints